Lucas Xavier Urias (born 20 February 1998), known simply as Lucas Xavier, is a Brazilian footballer who currently plays as a right back for Grêmio Osasco.

Club career
Urias joined Red Bull Brasil in 2015, and was loaned to affiliate Austrian club FC Liefering in early 2017. He made his debut for Liefering in a 1-0 win over Floridsdorfer AC, playing 67 minutes before being substituted.

Career statistics

Club

Notes

References

External links
 Profile at FC Liefering

1998 births
Living people
Brazilian footballers
Brazilian expatriate footballers
Association football defenders
Red Bull Brasil players
FC Liefering players
Associação Atlética Internacional (Limeira) players
2. Liga (Austria) players
Brazilian expatriate sportspeople in Austria
Expatriate footballers in Austria